Serasinghe Pathiranage Sachithra Chaturanga (born 13 April 1987) is a Sri Lankan cricketer who plays for the Tamil Union Cricket and Athletic Club. Sachithra has scored eight centuries and taken nearly 100 wickets for the Tamil Union club, Sri Lankan A team and the Sri Lankan Board XI.

Early and domestic career
Sachithra was educated at Nalanda College Colombo and played cricket for Nalanda College first XI team from 2003 to 2004.

In March 2018, he was named in Dambulla's squad for the 2017–18 Super Four Provincial Tournament. The following month, he was also named in Dambulla's squad for the 2018 Super Provincial One Day Tournament. In August 2018, he was named in Colombo's squad the 2018 SLC T20 League.

He was the leading run-scorer for Tamil Union Cricket and Athletic Club in the 2018–19 Premier League Tournament, with 1,001 runs in ten matches. In February 2019, Sri Lanka Cricket named him as the Player of the Tournament in the 2017–18 Premier League Tournament. In March 2019, he was named in Dambulla's squad for the 2019 Super Provincial One Day Tournament.

Notes

References

External links
 

1987 births
Cricketers from Colombo
Sri Lankan cricketers
Tamil Union Cricket and Athletic Club cricketers
Saracens Sports Club cricketers
Colts Cricket Club cricketers
Basnahira North cricketers
Ruhuna cricketers
Basnahira cricketers
Sri Lanka Cricket Combined XI cricketers
Basnahira Cricket Dundee cricketers
Alumni of Nalanda College, Colombo
Living people